The Best Years of Our Lives is a 1946 American drama film directed by William Wyler.

The Best Years of Our Lives may also refer to:

The Best Years of Our Lives (Steve Harley & Cockney Rebel album), 1975
"The Best Years of Our Lives" (Steve Harley & Cockney Rebel song), the album's title track
"Best Years of Our Lives" (song), a 1982 song by Modern Romance, later covered by Baha Men in 2001
The Best Years of Our Lives (Neil Diamond album), 1988
The Best Years of Our Lives (Richard Clapton album), 1989
"Best Years of Our Lives", a 1993 song by Orchestral Manoeuvres in the Dark from the album Liberator